The 2012–13 Botswana First Division South was the 48th season of the Botswana First Division South since its inception in 1966. It was played from August to May. Wonder Sporting were crowned champions.

Team summaries

Teams promoted from Botswana Division One
 
 
Teams relegated from Botswana Premier League
Prisons XI
Mogoditshane Fighters
Teams promoted to Botswana Premier League
Wonder SportingTeams relegated to Botswana Division One Gabane United
 Kanye SwallowsStadiums and locations'''

League table

References

Football in Botswana